Kevorkian (Կևորկյան) is an Armenian surname. Notable people with the surname include:

 Armen V. Kevorkian, American-Armenian visual effects supervisor and television director
 François Kevorkian (born 1954), French-born, U.S.-based DJ, producer, remixer and label owner
 Hagop Kevorkian (1872–1962), Armenian-American archeologist, connoisseur of art, and collector
 Jack Kevorkian (1928–2011), American pathologist and euthanasia proponent
 Ralph G. Kevorkian, co-pilot in TWA Flight 800 accident in 1996
 Raymond Kévorkian (born 1953), French Armenian historian
 Vahram Kevorkian (1887–1911), football player of Armenian descent

See also
 Kevorkian Death Cycle, American electro-industrial band from Riverside, California
 Gevorgyan
 Gevorkyan

Armenian-language surnames
Patronymic surnames
Surnames from given names